Mohamed Madkour was an Egyptian cyclist. He competed in two events at the 1924 Summer Olympics.

References

External links
 

Year of birth missing
Year of death missing
Egyptian male cyclists
Olympic cyclists of Egypt
Cyclists at the 1924 Summer Olympics
Place of birth missing